The Mesa Police Department is the primary law enforcement agency in Mesa, Arizona. The department employs 1,202 police officers. The department is headed by Chief Ken Cost.

History
The Mesa police department has existed since 1880.  

In 1991, local newspapers reported on a wide-ranging sex scandal in the department. Various police officers seem to have been involved in the molestation of children and using their wives as bait to blackmail other members of the department.

In 2016, a Mesa police officer, Philip Brailsford, shot Daniel Shaver five times and killed him in the hallway of a La Quinta Inn & Suites hotel in Mesa, while Shaver was on his hands and knees and following confusing and contradictory orders by the police. Brailsford was charged with second-degree murder and a lesser manslaughter charge, and found not guilty by a jury. Prosecutors argued the shooting was unjustified. Brailsford was reinstated in August 2018. Over a month later, he was granted retirement on medical grounds, as well as a pension of $2,500 per month.

Then-Chief Ramon Batista resigned suddenly in 2019 after an attempt at reforms in the police department policies and training.

A 2020 story by ABC News identified that "Mesa PD has a history of high-profile incidents involving excessive force" following the suspension of Officer Greg Clark. Assistant Chief Ed Wessing denied that problems existed in the force, while acknowledging that the public's trust was hurt.

Organization
Airport Unit operates at Phoenix-Mesa Gateway Airport
Aviation Support Unit with two fixed-wing and three rotary-wing aircraft. The unit was established in 1986 and is based at Falcon Field Airport.
Criminal Investigations Division
SWAT/Tactical  was established in 1975.

Stations
The department operates four stations:

Headquarters and Central 120 North Robson
Fiesta 1010 West Grove Avenue
Red Mountain 4333 East University Drive 
Superstition 2430 South Ellsworth Road

References

External links
Official website

Government of Mesa, Arizona
Municipal police departments of Arizona